Alan Maratovich Gatagov (born 23 January 1991) is a Russian former professional footballer.

Career

Club
Gatagov made his debut in the Russian Premier League on 16 May 2009 for Lokomotiv Moscow in a game against Terek Grozny.

Gatagov's first game for Dynamo Moscow in the 2012–13 Russian Cup game against FC Torpedo Moscow on 26 September 2012.

In December 2014, Gatagov went on trial with Kazakhstan Premier League side FC Irtysh Pavlodar, signing a contract with them in January 2015. Gatagov moved to fellow Kazakhstan Premier League side FC Taraz in July 2015.

On 1 April 2016, Gatagov signed a two-year contract with Levadia Tallinn.

International career 
Gatagov was a part of the Russia U-21 side that was competing in the 2011 European Under-21 Championship qualification. On 16 November 2010, Alan Gatagov scored a goal from a long distance against U-21 France national team and this goal gave his team victory by score 1-0.

Career statistics

Club

Personal life
His younger brother Soslan Gatagov is also a professional footballer.

References

External links 
 
 

1991 births
Living people
Sportspeople from Vladikavkaz
Ossetian people
Ossetian footballers
Russian footballers
Russia youth international footballers
Russia under-21 international footballers
FC Lokomotiv Moscow players
Russian Premier League players
FC Tom Tomsk players
FC Dynamo Moscow players
FC Anzhi Makhachkala players
Maccabi Petah Tikva F.C. players
Russian expatriate footballers
Expatriate footballers in Israel
Expatriate footballers in Kazakhstan
FC Irtysh Pavlodar players
FCI Levadia Tallinn players
Expatriate footballers in Estonia
Association football midfielders
Meistriliiga players
Russian expatriate sportspeople in Estonia
Russian expatriate sportspeople in Israel
Russian expatriate sportspeople in Kazakhstan